Backford Cross is a suburban locality of Ellesmere Port, within the unitary authority of Cheshire West and Chester, Cheshire, England. It is located at the southern end of the Wirral Peninsula around the A41/A5117 road junction.

The area is split between postcode districts, with parts in both Great Sutton, Ellesmere Port (CH66) and in Backford, Chester (CH1).

Previously farmland, 
Backford Cross is largely made up of residential homes built from 1990 onwards and serves as a commuter village to Ellesmere Port and Chester. The area covers the residential area around the Willowdale Way/Yeoman Way circle and the property south of Sycamore Park Garden Centre on the A41 Chester Road. Planning permission was granted by Cheshire West and Cheshire Council in 2019 for a housing development to the south west of the A41/A5117 junction. As part of the scheme, the developer was required to financially contribute towards improvements to local amenities and infrastructure.

References

Villages in Cheshire
Areas of Ellesmere Port